The New Balance Nationals Outdoor is a high school track and field meet in the United States. Since 1990, the National Scholastic Athletic Foundation has organized a national invitational championship meet in the United States and has been the host of many national records.

The meet is held at North Carolina Agricultural and Technical State University in Greensboro, North Carolina on the third weekend in June each year.

Notable athletes 

Sarah Brown
Jessica Beard
Sydney McLaughlin

Meet records

Boys

Girls

References

External links

 New Balance Nationals Outdoor website
 New Balance Nationals Outdoor Records Page

High school track and field competitions in the United States
Track and field in North Carolina
Annual track and field meetings
High school sports in North Carolina
Sports in Greensboro, North Carolina